The 2009 European Grand Prix (formally the 2009 Formula 1 Telefónica Grand Prix of Europe) was a Formula One motor race held on 23 August 2009 at the Valencia Street Circuit in Valencia, Spain. It was the 11th race of the 2009 Formula One season. The race was contested over 57 laps, an overall race distance of 308.9 km (191.9 mi). The winner was Rubens Barrichello for Brawn GP after starting from third on the grid. The 2008 world champion Lewis Hamilton finished second for McLaren-Mercedes, while 2007 world champion Kimi Räikkönen finished in third for Ferrari. Championship leader Jenson Button finished in seventh for the second race in a row, but extended his lead as Red Bull Racing's Mark Webber and Sebastian Vettel both failed to score.

It was Barrichello's first Grand Prix victory since the 2004 Chinese Grand Prix, 85 races before, while he was still driving for Ferrari. He also marked the 100th victory for a Brazilian driver in F1. Hamilton's second place granted him another podium, while Räikkönen's third place was his second podium in a row. The race saw the debut of GP2 Series driver Romain Grosjean. He replaced Nelson Piquet Jr. at Renault. This race also saw the Grand Prix return of Luca Badoer who had not raced since the 1999 Japanese Grand Prix. He replaced the injured Felipe Massa at Ferrari. Also, Timo Glock scored his first, and Toyota's last, fastest lap.

No overtakes were recorded during this race.

Report

Background
Jenson Button headed into the weekend still on top of the Drivers' Championship by 18.5 points in front of Mark Webber who had jumped ahead of team-mate Sebastian Vettel, who was on 47 points was only 3 points ahead of Brazilian Rubens Barrichello.

Brawn GP still lead the Constructor's Championship by 15.5 points from Red Bull Racing, with a further 58.5 points separating them from defending champions Ferrari. Ferrari had jumped Toyota after Kimi Räikkönen has finished 2nd place in the previous race.

Lewis Hamilton of McLaren-Mercedes won the last race in the championship, 4 weeks previously in Budapest for the Hungarian Grand Prix. He qualified 4th on the grid and won the race in dominating style to take his first race victory since the 2008 Chinese Grand Prix. Hamilton's win also marked the first victory for a car equipped with KERS. Kimi Räikkönen earned second place, his best result of the season. This however was only his second podium and his fourth points scoring finish of the season. Mark Webber finished third, Jenson Button finished 7th, and Rubens Barrichello came 10th while Sebastian Vettel retired because of suspension damage.

Felipe Massa dominated the 2008 race, leading 50 of 57 laps from pole and setting the fastest lap in the process. Former European Grand Prix winners Rubens Barrichello and Fernando Alonso were also racing, though Massa is the only winner at Valencia.

Massa would miss the Grand Prix after he underwent surgery following an accident in the second part of qualifying at the Hungarian Grand Prix. He had life-threatening injuries including a fractured skull, and it was expected that he would be in recovery for at least six weeks. Consequently, this Grand Prix would see the return of Luca Badoer to Formula One in order to replace Massa. Badoer has the record for most races in Formula One without points with 48; he was perhaps closest to scoring points when he retired from fourth in the 1999 European Grand Prix for Minardi.

Meanwhile, Renault announced on 4 August that Nelson Piquet Jr.'s contract with the team had been terminated with immediate effect; this decision was made after Piquet had not scored a single point all season. His replacement Romain Grosjean was announced on 18 August. It was believed that he would be racing for the remainder of the season.

Renault had initially been suspended from the Grand Prix as a result of the events that led to a wheel coming off Alonso's car during the Hungarian Grand Prix. However, Renault appealed to the FIA Court of Appeal, who overturned the suspension, and enabled Alonso to race at his home Grand Prix.

Practice and qualifying
Three practice sessions were held before the start of qualifying; the first was held on Friday morning and the second in the afternoon. Both sessions lasted 1 hour and 30 minutes with weather conditions dry throughout, as the air temperature at 27 °C (80 °F) and the track temperature at 36 °C (97 °F) in session one. Session two saw the air temperature at 30 °C (86 °F) and the track temperature rise dramatically to 52 °C (125 °F) in session two. The third session was held on Saturday morning and lasted 1 hour; it was also dry throughout with the air temperature at 28 °C (82 °F) and the track temperature at 41 °C (106 °F).

Brawn came back to form with the track temperature higher than at other circuits making Barrichello the pace-setter with the two McLarens behind him. Kovalainen and Hamilton were only separated by 0.018 seconds. Nico Rosberg who has topped most Friday practice sessions throughout the season struggled in his Williams coming 14th in session 1, 1.3 seconds off Barrichello, while team-mate Kazuki Nakajima fared better, coming 7th. However both Rosberg and Nakajima got into the top five in the second session. Fernando Alonso in his home grand prix topped the second session while Hamilton came last after spinning out early on and damaging his car.

Renault's Romain Grosjean had a solid two sessions, coming 17th and 13th respectively, although Alonso outpaced him in each by over a second. Luca Badoer came 20th and 18th in the two Friday sessions as he continued to struggle with the car as team-mate Kimi Räikkönen was 11th and 10th in the two sessions. The Toyotas struggled in session 1 with Jarno Trulli and Timo Glock coming 18th and 19th respectively. Although there was a small piece of hope as Trulli in the second session came 12th and Glock came 15th, 0.225 seconds behind his team-mate.

Force India's big updates were showing improvements as Adrian Sutil came 6th in the first session, while in the second session Sutil came 6th again while Giancarlo Fisichella showed a bit of form when he came in 8th. BMW Sauber were still struggling as they came 12th and 15th. But Robert Kubica was hopefully showing a light at the end of the tunnel as he came 7th in the second session, splitting the two Force Indias.

Red Bull seemed to be struggling in the hotter conditions as they were outpaced in both sessions by title challengers Brawn. Vettel (5th and 9th) and Webber (8th and 14th) were hopeful things would improve on Saturday.

It was a surprise result on Saturday as Adrian Sutil topped the time sheets, as Vettel's engine blew halfway through the session causing it to be red-flagged as oil was on the track. The other Force India, Fisichella, was 0.621 seconds behind his team-mate in P6.
Kazuki Nakajima came in 2nd with Robert Kubica coming in 3rd. Heikki Kovalainen was the only one of the major contenders for pole in the top 5 as he came in 4th ahead of Nico Rosberg.

The Brawns were a little off the pace as Button (7th) and Barrichello (12th) were hoping for better. Both Red Bull cars were in the bottom 5 as Vettel (18th) and Webber (17th) continued to struggle in the hot conditions. Luca Badoer continued to be well behind the pace as he came in at 20th, 3.055 seconds behind session winner Adrian Sutil.

The qualifying session on Saturday afternoon was split into three parts. The first part ran for 20 minutes, and cars that finished the session 16th or lower were eliminated from qualifying. The second part of qualifying lasted 15 minutes and eliminated cars that finished in positions 11 to 15. The final part of qualifying determined the positions from first to tenth, and decided pole position. Cars which failed to make the final session could refuel before the race, so ran lighter in those sessions. Cars which competed in the final session of qualifying were not allowed to refuel before the race, and as such carried more fuel than in the previous sessions. Weather conditions for the session saw the air temperature at 30 °C (86 °F) and the track temperature at 39 °C (102 °F).

The first part of qualifying saw Button top the time sheets, with a lap of 1:38.531. With all the optimism of the pace of the Force India, Fisichella came 16th and was knocked out. Another big name that failed to make it was Kazuki Nakajima who came 2nd in practice just a few hours beforehand. Trulli, Alguersuari and Badoer were the others that joined them in not making it through to Q2.

The second session was topped by the other Brawn, Rubens Barrichello, a time of 1:38.076; half a second quicker than the quickest time in Q1. Sebastian Buemi came bottom of the session, half a second behind débutante Romain Grosjean in 14th. Glock, Sutil and Heidfeld were the others eliminated. Robert Kubica ended a long drought and made it to Q3.

The final 10-minute shoot-out began with very close lap times. As the chequered flag fell everyone was on their final lap. Button was the first of the main contenders to cross it for the final time and he didn't improve and stayed 5th. Next was Barrichello as he crossed the line and didn't improve and stayed 2nd. Kovalainen looked set for pole position but a lockup and a slide in the final corner could only get him up into second, so Hamilton didn't feel the need to complete his lap with no one else on fast laps. Hamilton got his first pole position of the season, but more importantly, it was a McLaren 1–2. Barrichello came third and a surprise 4th for Vettel as he split the Brawns. Räikkönen even with race fuel on board posted a lap time that was 1.279 seconds quicker than Luca Badoer's time in Q1 on low fuel. This was also the first time Lewis Hamilton had been on pole since the 2008 Chinese Grand Prix. Hamilton became the first driver to take pole position with a KERS car. This was also the first instance of an all KERS front row.

The fuel-adjusted times showed that Barrichello was actually the fastest in qualifying with Kovalainen 0.216 seconds behind him. Hamilton was third with Button in fourth and Vettel in 5th. Even though it had been an encouraging sign to see BMW in the top 10, the fuel-adjustments showed that even with fuel taken into account, the BMW was still 1.114 seconds slower than the Brawn of Rubens Barrichello.

Race

Around 12:00 (UTC) the formation lap for the Grand Prix started with race starting a few minutes later. With the air temperature at 31 °C (88 °F) and the track temperature at 49 °C (120 °F), it looked like the conditions were favouring the Brawn cars. The race started with Lewis Hamilton, Heikki Kovalainen and Rubens Barrichello as the top three after the first lap. Kimi Räikkönen had a good start making his way to fourth from sixth on the grid. Jenson Button had a poor start dropping to ninth in the first few corners, while Luca Badoer starting from the back of the grid jumped six positions to 14th at the start. Romain Grosjean then tapped the rear of Badoer's Ferrari, causing the Italian to spin. Grosjean had to pit for repairs, as did Timo Glock after he and Sébastien Buemi collided, the Swiss driver also pitting for a new nose. Mark Webber down in ninth got on the radio claiming that Button had cut the chicane to stop Webber's attempt of a pass. Button then fell behind Webber although it is unclear whether it was a legitimate pass or Jenson let the Red Bull driver through.

On lap 15, Hamilton and Sebastian Vettel came into the pits. Hamilton rejoined in sixth place but Vettel's fuel pump failed to work so he had to come in again. Kovalainen came in a lap later while Barrichello was pushing to try and build a gap. Button and Räikkönen pitted on lap 18, the Finn coming out in eighth while Button rejoined in 11th. Barrichello came in on lap 19, the Brazilian had made a lot of ground as he rejoined just behind Lewis after being around 10 seconds adrift. But most importantly for Brawn he had jumped the other McLaren of Kovalainen. On lap 24, a lot of smoke was pouring from the rear end of Vettel's car and he retired with a suspected engine failure. Hamilton was ordered over the radio to try to cool down his rear brakes as the temperature were getting out of control, but he was unable to shake off the challenge of Barrichello in second.

Hamilton seemed to have found some pace but he pitted soon after on lap 37. He came in but his new tyres were still in their blankets and a lot of time was wasted. Barrichello came in three laps later on lap 40 and came out in first. Button came in on lap 41 along with Alonso leaving Webber to tackle a bit of traffic. Webber pitted and the traffic had cost him as he came out behind Button and Kubica leaving himself out of the points. Räikkönen also jumped Kovalainen in the second round of stops.

As the race was heading into the closing stages, Hamilton seemed to be on a charge to try to catch the leading Brawn but in reality it looked only a mistake would stop the Brazilian winning. Meanwhile, Button was lapping a second off the pace just making sure his car got to the end. Kubica was catching Button at a high rate of knots but it seemed a long shot if Button was going to lose them two points. Hamilton came second, while Finn Räikkönen came home in third. Kovalainen came fourth, while Nico Rosberg had a reasonably quiet race as he came home in fifth. Fernando Alonso came sixth in his home race, championship leader Jenson Button came seventh, while Robert Kubica came eighth, only his second points scoring finish so far this season. Neither Red Bull's Vettel or Webber scored a point, while Barrichello moved into second place in the drivers championship. Button kept his lead although he only added two points to his tally. Brawn edged further ahead in the constructors' championship by scoring 12 points with Red Bull not scoring a single point this weekend.

Classification

Qualifying
Cars that use the KERS system are marked with "‡"

Race
Cars that use the KERS system are marked with "‡"

Championship standings after the race

Drivers' Championship standings

Constructors' Championship standings

 Note: Only the top five positions are included for both sets of standings.

See also 
 2009 Valencia GP2 Series round

References

European
European Grand Prix
European Grand Prix
21st century in Valencia
August 2009 sports events in Europe